Robert Darknall or Dartnoll (by 1501 – 1553/1556), of Canterbury, Kent and London, was an English politician.

Family
Darknall was educated at the Middle Temple. In 1522, he was married to a widow named Alice Goseborne, the daughter and coheiress of the Canterbury MP, Henry Goseborne. They had at least two sons and one daughter.

Career
Darknall was a Member of Parliament for Canterbury in 1529, 1536, 1542, 1547, and March 1553, and for Rochester in October 1553.

References

1550s deaths
People from Canterbury
Politicians from London
Year of birth uncertain
English MPs 1529–1536
English MPs 1536
English MPs 1542–1544
English MPs 1547–1552
English MPs 1553 (Edward VI)
English MPs 1553 (Mary I)